"Honey" is the eleventh single by L'Arc-en-Ciel. It was released simultaneously with "Shinshoku ~Lose Control~" and "Kasou" on July 8, 1998.

The release day of "Honey" was the same as B'z's single "Home". B'z had already had 20 consecutive number-one singles on the Oricon weekly charts, approaching Seiko Matsuda's record of 24. "Honey" recorded first week sales of over 544,000 copies, but "Home" debuted at No. 1 with sales of over 559,000 copies. Nevertheless, it topped the Oricon charts the following week and sold over one million copies. The single was re-released on August 30, 2006.

Track listing

Chart positions

References

1998 singles
L'Arc-en-Ciel songs
Oricon Weekly number-one singles
Songs written by Hyde (musician)
1998 songs